Morrice is a surname, predominantly of Scottish origin. Notable people with the name include:
Ian Morrice, Australian CEO
James Wilson Morrice (1865–1924), Canadian landscape painter
Jane Morrice (born 1954), Irish politician
Mike Morrice, Canadian politician
Roger Morrice (1628–1702), English Puritan minister

See also
Maurice (disambiguation)
Morice (disambiguation)
Morris (disambiguation)

Surnames of Scottish origin